Helgi Jóhannesson (born 18 November 1982) is an Icelandic badminton player.

Achievements

BWF International Challenge/Series 
Men's doubles

Mixed doubles

  BWF International Challenge tournament
  BWF International Series tournament
  BWF Future Series tournament

References

External links 
 

1982 births
Living people
Icelandic male badminton players